Chadrack Muzungu Lukombe (born 14 April 1997) is a Democratic Republic of the Congo footballer who plays as a winger for Moroccan club RS Berkane. He made one appearance for the DR Congo national team in 2017.

Club career
In January 2019, Lukombe moved abroad after signing for ENPPI SC, after representing AS Vita Club and Athletic Club Ujana in his home country. On 31 January of the following year, he joined UD Almería and was assigned to the B-team in Tercera División.

In August 2020, Lukombe was loaned to French Championnat National side US Boulogne, with an option to buy.

Career statistics

Club

International

References

External links

1998 births
Living people
Democratic Republic of the Congo footballers
Association football wingers
AS Vita Club players
Egyptian Premier League players
ENPPI SC players
Tercera División players
UD Almería B players
US Boulogne players
RS Berkane players
Championnat National players
Championnat National 3 players
Botola players
Democratic Republic of the Congo international footballers
Democratic Republic of the Congo expatriate footballers
Democratic Republic of the Congo expatriate sportspeople in Egypt
Democratic Republic of the Congo expatriate sportspeople in Spain
Democratic Republic of the Congo expatriate sportspeople in France
Democratic Republic of the Congo expatriate sportspeople in Morocco
Expatriate footballers in Egypt
Expatriate footballers in Spain
Expatriate footballers in France
Expatriate footballers in Morocco
Democratic Republic of the Congo under-20 international footballers
21st-century Democratic Republic of the Congo people